The Lesser Caucasus, also called Caucasus Minor, is the second of the two main ranges of the Caucasus Mountains, of length about . The western portion of the Lesser Caucasus overlaps and converges with east Turkey and northwest Iran. It is connected to the Greater Caucasus by the Likhi Range (Georgia) and separated from it by the Kolkhida Lowland (Georgia) in the west and Kura-Aras Lowland (Azerbaijan) (by the Kura River) in the east.

Description
The highest peak is Aragats, .

The borders between Georgia, Turkey, Armenia, Azerbaijan and Iran run through the range, although its crest does not usually define the border. The range was historically called Anticaucasus or Anti-Caucasus (Greek: Αντι-Καύκασος, Russian: Антикавка́з, Анти-Кавка́з).  This usage is commonly found in older sources. Current usage tends towards using the name Lesser Caucasus, but Anti-caucasus can still be found in modern texts.

See also
 Ark of Nuh or Noah
 İlandağ in Nakhchivan, Azerbaijan

References

+
Mountain ranges of Azerbaijan
Mountain ranges of Georgia (country)
Mountain ranges of Armenia
Mountain ranges of Turkey
Mountain ranges of Iran
Physiographic sections
Mountain ranges of the Republic of Artsakh